Denham may refer to:

People 
Denham (surname)
Denham Price (1940–2013), South African cricketer

Places 
In the United Kingdom
 Denham, Buckinghamshire
Denham Aerodrome
Denham Country Park
Denham Film Studios
 Denham railway station
 Denham Roundabout
 Denham, Mid Suffolk, Suffolk
 Denham, St Edmundsbury, Suffolk
 Denham Street, Suffolk
 Corton Denham, Somerset
 Great Denham, Bedfordshire

Elsewhere
 Denham, Western Australia, within Shark Bay
 Denham Town, Kingston, Jamaica
 Denham, Indiana, United States
 Denham, Minnesota, United States
 Den Ham, Twenterand, Netherlands

Other 
 Denham baronets, a baronetcy created in 1693

See also 
 Dinham (disambiguation)
 Denholm
 Dunham (disambiguation)